Wau (Arabic: واو Wāw; also known as Wow, Waw, or Wau Town) is a city in northwestern South Sudan, on the western bank of the Jur River, that serves as capital for Western Bahr el Ghazal (and formerly Wau State). A culturally, ethnically and linguistically diverse urban center and trading hub, Wau is also the former headquarters of Western Bahr el Ghazal.

History 
Wau was initially established by the French as Fort Desaix and later was established as a zariba (fortified base) by slave-traders in the 19th century. During the time of condominium rule, the city became an administrative center.

One of the first insurgent Anyanya attacks on the Sudanese Armed Forces (SAF) took place on the Wau barracks in January 1964.

During the Second Sudanese Civil War, Wau remained a SAF garrison town. It was the scene of extensive fighting in the spring of 1998. Battles erupted again in the town in the spring of 1980s, killing several hundred people. This forced the Dinka in Wau to seek safety in the eastern side of Wau. The Dinka were said to have migrated to the state today known as Warrap.

In 2010, the Ministry of Housing, Physical Planning and Environment proposed to reshape the city as a giraffe.

South Sudanese Civil War 

Following the outbreak of the South Sudanese Civil War, the town has experienced numerous clashes, massacres, and much destruction at the hands of anti-government as well as government forces. In April 2014, Nuer soldiers belonging to the local SPLA garrison mutinied after hearing of a massacre at Mapel. They clashed with SPLA loyalists, and then fled into the rural countryside, joining a long march of other deserters to Sudan. About 700 Nuer civilians subsequently sought protection at Wau's UNMISS base; most of them were family members of the deserted soldiers, while others were students.

In 2016, Wau experienced heavy clashes that displaced much of its Fertit population and led to widespread destruction. In April 2017, Dinka soldiers of the SPLA and Mathiang Anyoor militiamen carried out a massacre of non-Dinka civilians in the town, killing up to 50 people, and displacing thousands.

Population 
The population of Wau is ethnically diverse. Most of the inhabitants are Luo and Fertit, as the town lies on the tribal boundary between these two peoples. Furthermore, minorities belonging to the Dinka of Marial Baai, peoples can be found in Wau. Due to its diversity, Wau has repeatedly suffered from ethnic violence.

Demographics 
In 2008, Wau was the third-largest city in South Sudan, by population, behind national capital Juba and Malakal, in Upper Nile State. At that time, the estimated population of the city of Wau was about 128,100. In 2011, the city's population was estimated at about 151,320.

Religion 
Its Cathedral of St. Mary (built 1905, before the erection of the former Apostolic Prefecture of Bahr el-Ghazal) is the episcopal see of the Roman Catholic Diocese of Wau, which serves the province's religious majority.

Economy 

Wau is a vibrant economic center by the standards of the newly established Republic of South Sudan, and serves as hub for trade between Darfur, Bahr al Ghazal, and Equatoria. The major contributors to the local economy include:
Buffalo Commercial Bank branch
Equity Bank (South Sudan) branch
Ivory Bank branch
Kenya Commercial Bank (South Sudan) branch
Catholic University of South Sudan, Wau campus
University of Bahr El-Ghazal
Wau Airport
Wau County Government
Wau state Government
RCS - Radio & Satellite Communication
Commercial Bank of Ethiopia (South Sudan Subsidiary Comp.) expected shortly

Transport and infrastructure 

 Wau Railway Station - is the terminus of a narrow gauge branch line of the Sudan Railways. A plan exists, as of 2008, to open a standard gauge line north from Gulu in Uganda to Wau. Through trains from Khartoum to Mombasa would be possible only if one of the lines was regauged. Its functionality would depend on post-conflict reconstruction.
 Wau Airport -  The airport,  has a single paved runway which measures  in length.
 The city hosts University of Bahr El-Ghazal and many secondary and primary schools.
 The Catholic University of South Sudan maintains a campus in the city.
 Wau Stadium - A soccer stadium in the middle of town
 The Cathedral of St. Mary in Wau was built between 1951 and 1956.
 There are five (5) main roads out of town:
 B38-North leads directly north to Gogrial, South Sudan
 B43-South  leads southeast to Tonj, South Sudan
 A44-South leads directly south to Tumbura, South Sudan
 B41-West leads west to Raga, South Sudan
 B43-North leads northwest to Aweil, South Sudan

Geography and climate 
Like other parts of South Sudan and the East Sudanian savanna, Wau has a tropical savanna climate (Köppen Aw), with a wet season and a dry season and the temperature being hot year-round. The hottest time of year is from March to May, just before the wet season starts.

Wau receives  of rain over 102.4 precipitation days, with a distinct wet and dry season like most tropical savanna climates. Almost no rain falls from November to March. August, the wettest month, receives  of rainfall on average. September has 23.7 precipitation days, which is the most of any month. Humidity is much higher in the wet season than the dry season, with February having a humidity at just 26% and August having a humidity at 77%. Wau receives 2777 hours of sunshine annually on average, with the sunshine being distributed fairly evenly across the year, although it is lower during the wet season. December receives the most sunshine, while July receives the least.

Notable locals 
Some of the notable people from Wau include 
 Captain Bulus Abushaka - Famous Sudanese soccer goal keeper
 Captain Samuel Illario - El Marikh start 
 Clement Mboro - veteran politician
 Cardinal Gabriel Zubeir Wako - Retired archbishop of Khartoum archdiocese (Sudan, then including South Sudan)
 Prof Barri Arkanjelo Wanji - veteran Anya Anya /SPLM/A soldier and long serving politician
 Dan Samuel - National Basketball player and veteran construction manager
 Joseph Ukel - veteran politician

See also 
 Bahr el Ghazal
 Wau Airport
 Western Bahr el Ghazal

References

Bibliography

Sources and external links 

 Location of Wau At Google Maps
 GCatholic, with Google satellite photo/map - Wau's Roman Catholic cathedral of Mary
 Human Rights Watch (1999) Famine in Sudan, 1998: The Human Rights Causes.
 Detailed Map of The City of Wau
 Photos of Wau River Lodge, A Private Establishment

Populated places in Western Bahr el Ghazal
State capitals in South Sudan